No Sugar is a postcolonial play written by Indigenous Australian playwright Jack Davis, set during the Great Depression, in Northam, Western Australia, Moore River Native Settlement and Perth. The play focuses on the Millimurras, an Australian Aboriginal family, and their attempts at subsistence.

The play explores the marginalisation of Aboriginal Australians in the 1920s and 1930s in Australia under the jurisdiction of a white government. The pivotal themes in the play include racism, white empowerment and superiority, Aboriginal disempowerment, the materialistic values held by the white Australians, Aboriginal dependency on their colonisers, and the value of family held by Aboriginal people.

The play was first performed by the Playhouse Company in association with the Australian Theatre Trust, for the Festival of Perth on 18 February 1985. It also was chosen as a contribution to Expo 86 in Canada  No Sugar forms the first part of a trilogy, the First Born Trilogy, which also includes the titles The Dreamers and Barungin (Smell the Wind).  The trilogy was first performed by the Melbourne Theatre Company in May 1988 at the Fitzroy Town Hall. The play won the 1987 Western Australian Premiers Award and in 1992 the Kate Challis RAKA Award for Indigenous Playwrights.

The play utilises the perambulant model, which is a technique used in drama to dislocate the audience involving multiple points of focus. Throughout No Sugar it is employed to convey a sense of displacement to the audience, representative of the isolation felt by the Aboriginal people unable and unwilling to assimilate to white culture.

Characters

Jimmy Munday, the protagonist.

Gran Munday, Jimmy's mother, a traditional Aboriginal woman.

Milly Millimurra, Jimmy's sister, who has three children.

Sam Millimurra, Milly's husband. .

Joe Millimurra, Mary's love interest and Milly's eldest son.

Cissie Millimurra, Milly's daughter.

David Millimurra - Milly's youngest son.

A. O. Neville, Chief Protector of Aborigines.

Miss Dunn, his secretary.

Mr Neal, Superintendent of Moore River Native Settlement. Abuses Indigenous people and is lecherous to Indigenous girls.

Matron Neal, his wife, Matron of the hospital.

Sister Eileen, a Catholic missionary.

Sergeant Carrol, sergeant of the Northam Police.

Constable Kerr, member of the Northam Police.

Frank Brown, an unemployed farmer who befriends Jimmy Munday.

Mary Dargurru, Joe's love interest. An outspoken girl who is mistreated by Neal, works for the Matron at the settlement.

Billy Kimberley, a Black tracker, an Aborigine working for Mr Neal.

Kundavai Pirattiyar, a princess from the Chola Dynasty who hears the story of the injustice given to both Munday and Millimurra‘s family and tries to stop the injustice being served. 

Bluey, a Black tracker.

Topsy, Mary's subservient and submissive friend who also works for the Matron.

Justice of the Peace, a farmer who sentences Frank Brown, Jimmy and Sam for alcohol abuse.

Notes

Plays by Jack Davis
1985 plays
Indigenous Australian theatre
Stolen Generations